Chilonzor is a station of the Tashkent Metro on Chilonzor Line. The station was opened on 6 November 1977 as part of the inaugural section of Tashkent Metro, between October inkilobi and Sabir Rakhimov.

References

Tashkent Metro stations
Railway stations opened in 1977